Oak Woods Cemetery is a large lawn cemetery in Chicago, Illinois. Located at 1035 E. 67th Street, in the Greater Grand Crossing area of Chicago's South Side.

Oak Woods is the final resting place of several famous Americans including Harold Washington, Ida B. Wells, Jesse Owens, and Enrico Fermi. It is also the setting for a mass grave and memorial for Confederate prisoners of war from Camp Douglas, called the Confederate Mound.

History
Oak Woods Cemetery was chartered on February 12, 1853. It was designed by landscape architect Adolph Strauch who created a ‘landscape-lawn cemetery’ on the 183 acres emphasizing grade changes with curving streets and well-planned drainage creating a uniform composition which was free of fences. The first burials took place in 1860.

After the American Civil War (1861–1865), several thousand Confederate soldiers, prisoners who died at Camp Douglas, were reburied here. According to a plaque on the site, soldiers were buried in "concentric trenches." A monument and marker, which former Kentucky Lieutenant Governor John C. Underwood helped construct, probably inflates the number of soldiers buried as 6,000, but lists the names of more than 4,000. Another, smaller memorial commemorates the Union soldiers who died at Camp Douglas, often from contagious diseases. The bodies from Camp Douglas had originally been buried at Camp Douglas and the City Cemetery, which was closed and removed during expansion of Lincoln Park and urban renewal following the Great Chicago Fire of 1871. The bodies were exhumed and re-interred together in a mass grave, which came to be known as Confederate Mound, reputedly the largest documented mass grave in the Western Hemisphere.

In response to the establishment of the Confederate memorial, in 1896, Thomas D. Lowther, a pre-war resident of the South, erected near it an abolitionist monument. The abolition monument is a large black marble cenotaph to pre-war southerners, "unknown heroric men", "martyrs" who had opposed slavery and disunion. Near the beginning of the war, Lowther had been forced to flee his home in Florida because of his anti-slavery and pro-Union stance.

The cemetery contains the graves of many prominent African Americans, including Chicago's first African-American mayor, Harold Washington. Journalist and anti-lynching activist Ida B. Wells, Olympic sports hero Jesse Owens, business and publishing magnate John H. Johnson, Gospel music pioneer Thomas A. Dorsey and Gospel music star Albertina Walker are also buried in the cemetery.

The cemetery is also the final resting place of 45 victims of the Iroquois Theatre fire, in which more than 600 people died.

Famous nuclear physicist Enrico Fermi has his final resting place here, as do several other faculty members of the University of Chicago. The cemetery also has a section for U.S. veterans of several wars, and a separately-maintained Jewish section.

Notable burials
In 2022, the Hyde Park Historical Society created an interactive directory application for monuments at the cemetery.
 Donald N. Aldrich (1917–1947), naval aviator and ace
 Cap Anson (1852–1922), Major League Baseball Hall of Fame
 Frank Bacon (1864–1922), actor and playwright
 Ferdinand Lee Barnett (1852–1936), lawyer and civil rights activist. Spouse of Ida B. Wells.
 Adolphus C. Bartlett (1844–1922), businessman, philanthropist
 Gary Becker (1930–2014), economist, Nobel Prize winner
 Arthur M. Brazier (1921–2010), activist, pastor
 Woodnut S. Burr (1861–1952), ardent worker for Women's suffrage in the United States
 Frank Butler (1872–1899), pitcher and outfielder in pre-Negro leagues baseball
 Otis Clay (1942–2016), blues and soul singer
 Clarence H. Cobbs (1908–1979), founder of the First Church of Deliverance
 James "Big Jim" Colosimo (1878–1920), boss of the Chicago Outfit
 Henry Chandler Cowles (1869–1939), professor of botany at University of Chicago, pioneer American ecologist, conservationist
 William Craig (1855–1902), first Secret Service agent to die on duty
 Charles S. Deneen (1863–1940), 23rd Governor of Illinois
 Thomas A. Dorsey (1899–1993), composer, the "father of Gospel music"
 Walter Eckersall (1886–1930), All-American quarterback and sportswriter
 Mircea Eliade (1907–1986), Romanian historian of religion, fiction writer, philosopher, and professor at the University of Chicago
 Enrico Fermi (1901–1954), physicist, Nobel Prize winner, creator of the first nuclear reactor
 Henry Blake Fuller (1857–1929), writer, author of early work in gay literature, Bertram Cope's Year
 Norman Golb (1928–2020), historian
 Nancy Green (1834–1923), storyteller, cook, activist, and the first woman to portray Aunt Jemima
 Jake Guzik (1886–1956), gangster and bookkeeper for Al Capone; aka "Greasy Thumb"
 John Marshall Hamilton (1847–1905), 18th Governor of Illinois
 William Draper Harkins (1873–1951), nuclear chemist
 Monroe Heath (1827–1894), mayor of Chicago
 John Christen Johansen (1876–1964), portraitist and landscape painter
 Charles Johnson (1909–2006), pitcher and outfielder for the Chicago American Giants of the Negro leagues
 Eunice W. Johnson (1916–2010), business magnate and spouse of John H. Johnson
 John H. Johnson (1918–2005), founder and publisher of Ebony and Jet magazines, spouse of Eunice W. Johnson
 Kenesaw Mountain Landis (1866–1944), Hall of Fame, First Commissioner of Baseball
 Richard Loeb (1905–1936), crime figure – cremated here, ashes returned to family
 Little Brother Montgomery (1906–1985), blues piano player and singer
 S. Grace Nicholes (1870–1922), social reformer
 Jesse Owens (1913–1980), Olympic track and field champion
 Fred Rice Jr. (1926–2011), first African-American Superintendent of the Chicago Police Department
 Eugene Sawyer (1934–2008), second African-American Mayor of Chicago (1987–1989)
 J. Young Scammon (1812–1890), attorney, banker, newspaper publisher
 Maud Slye (1879–1954), University of Chicago pathologist
 Roebuck "Pops" Staples (1915–2000), Gospel singer
 Willie Stokes (1937–1986), Chicago mobster
 William Hale Thompson (1869–1944), Mayor of Chicago
 June Travis (1914–2008), film actress
 Herbert J. Tweedie (1864–1906), golf course architect
 Bill Veeck (1914–1986), Major League Baseball owner – cremated here, ashes returned to family
 Albertina Walker (1929–2010), singer, songwriter, "Queen of Gospel"
 Harold Washington (1922–1987), lawyer, politician, first African American Mayor of Chicago
 Ida B. Wells (1862–1931), social reformer, civil rights activist. Spouse of Ferdinand Lee Barnett.
 Junior Wells (1934–1998), Blues musician
 Ben Wilson (1967–1984), Chicago Simeon H.S., 1984–85 #1 Ranked high school basketball player in America
 James Hutchinson Woodworth (1804–1869), Mayor of Chicago
 Otto Young (1844–1907), "Merchant Millionaire" of Chicago and Lake Geneva, Wisconsin

Roland Burris tomb

The tomb recites Burris accomplishments and received considerable publicity (often negative) after Burris' appointment.

See also
 List of cemeteries in Cook County, Illinois
 List of mausoleums

References

External links
 Official Oakwoods Cemetery corporate website
 Graveyards.com: Oak Woods Cemetery
 Department of Veterans Affairs page on the Confederate mound
 
 
 

Cemeteries in Chicago
South Side, Chicago
Confederate States of America cemeteries
1853 establishments in Illinois
19th century in Chicago
Historic American Landscapes Survey in Illinois
Rural cemeteries